The Lilly Awards are an American awards ceremony recognizing extraordinary women in theatre. An annual celebration is held in New York to honor female writers, composers, directors, designers, producers and advocates. Some men have also been awarded the Miss Lilly, a prize in recognition of their advocacy for women in a male-dominated industry. Named after Lillian Hellman, the Lilly Awards were founded in 2010 by the playwrights Julia Jordan, Marsha Norman and Theresa Rebeck. Marsha Norman is a Pulitzer Prize and Tony-award winning playwright, whose work includes the book of the musical The Color Purple and book and lyrics of The Secret Garden.

The Lillys promote the work of women in theatre by partnering with the Dramatists Guild to produce The Count, the first study of its kind to measure the data of the theatre industry and investigate the lack of gender parity in American theatre. Between 2011-2014, in a study sampling 2,508 productions in American theatres, only 22% of the plays and musicals produced in America were written by women.

By 2018, there have been a few notable attempts to draw the attention of theatres to the work of American female playwrights, including LA-based group, The Kilroys, who founded an annual industry-based survey of excellent female and trans playwrights' work in 2013.

Previous Lilly Award winners include Annie Baker, who won the 2014 Pulitzer Prize for Drama for her play The Flick, Lynn Nottage, who won the 2017 Pulitzer Prize for Sweat, Martyna Majok, who won the 2018 Pulitzer Prize for her play Cost of Living, and Jeanine Tesori, who is the most recognised female composer in history with five Broadway musicals and five Tony Award Nominations, including the 2015 Tony Award for Best Original Score for Fun Home.

Feminism at the Lillys 

Many of Broadway and Off-Broadway's leading actors have given speeches at the Lilly Awards highlighting the experiences of women working in the male-dominated theatre. These speeches often acknowledge the forces of misogyny, racism and patriarchy, while encouraging the mission of the Lillys to highlight women in theatre. Presenters at the Lillys have included:

 Feminist activist Gloria Steinem 
 Broadway playwright and TV writer Theresa Rebeck
 Actor, singer and songwriter Amanda Green (Tony Award for Best Original Score, Hands on a Hardbody)

In a speech at the 8th annual Lilly Awards ceremony, playwright Sarah Ruhl said:

"I want to thank all of you and celebrate the work of other women in the theatre this year—you’ve inspired me, you’ve lit the way. And I have faith—there will come a time when the public humiliation that every artist must endure will be spread out equally over both genders, and will be leveled equally by both genders. And if that kind of equity does not in itself seem something to celebrate, let’s celebrate how we get there—by invoking our mothers, by refusing to shut up, and by making our own fun."

At the 2018 Lilly Awards, after being recognized with the "You've Changed The World" Award, playwright Eve Ensler said:

"I hope it will be a lot easier for you than it was for me and women of my generation, but racist patriarchy is a persistent and devious system of oppression. It is far more tenacious and relentless than I had imagined.

There are many things that will drive you mad as women playwrights. Plays that get diminished by being called a woman’s play, as if that’s an insult. We never call male driven plays, men’s plays. We call them plays. Because men are still seen as the drivers of the world. When I wrote The Vagina Monologues, journalists were constantly asking me with a kind of pity, how I felt that only women come to my show. I would say, “Only women? You mean 51% of the population? Thank you, women.”

They will tell you your work isn’t commercial and that is code for, “isn’t written by a white man,” or “pure entertainment.” And to be honest, no one really has a bloody idea what will become commercial—meaning what play will attract a large audience. It has to do with timing, the political and cultural climate, and tapping into an invisible zeitgeist. I can’t tell you how many times I was told no one would come to see a play about vaginas, that it was professional suicide, that I would be marginalized and exiled."

Broadway Cabaret 

The Lilly Awards hosts a Broadway Cabaret, a 24 Hour Plays event, and occasionally, 24 Hour Musicals.

Recent award recipients

References

External links 
 
 Playbill article about the 2017 Lilly Awards ceremony with photos

American theater awards